Indulata L. Sukla (7 March 1944 – 30 June 2022) was an Indian academic, who was professor of mathematics for more than three decades at Sambalpur University, Sambalpur, Odisha.

She did her schooling from Maharani Prem Kumari Girls’ School and B.Sc. with Mathematics Honours from M.P.C. College, Baripada. She completed her M.Sc. in Mathematics from Ravenshaw College, Cuttack in 1966, and had a brief stint as a lecturer in M.P.C. College, before moving to the University of Jabalpur with a CSIR Fellowship to pursue Ph.D. under the supervision of Tribikram Pati. While pursuing her researches, she joined Sambalpur University in November 1970 as a lecturer in the School of Mathematical Sciences, and continued there till her retirement in March 2004.

She is the author of the textbook Number Theory and Its Applications to Cryptography (Cuttack: Kalyani Publishers, 2000).
In her research, she worked with English mathematician Brian Kuttner on Fourier Series.
 
She was a Life Member of the American Mathematical Society (AMS) and the Indian Mathematical Society (IMS).

Awards and honours
The Orissa Mathematical Society (OMS) gave her the Lifetime Achievement Award for her work in Number Theory, Cryptography and Analysis. She received the award from Professor Ramachandran Balasubramanian, Director of the Institute of Mathematical Sciences, Chennai at the 42nd Annual Conference of OMS held at Vyasanagar Autonomous College, Jajpur Road, Orissa on 7 February 2015.

Selected publications
.
.

References

1944 births
2022 deaths
20th-century Indian mathematicians
Indian women mathematicians
Scientists from Odisha
People from Baripada
Fellows of the American Mathematical Society
Number theorists
Women scientists from Odisha
20th-century Indian women scientists
20th-century women mathematicians
Sambalpur University alumni